Acrocercops diplacopa is a moth of the family Gracillariidae, known from Java, Indonesia. It was described by Edward Meyrick in 1936. The hostplant for the species is Ficus septica.

References

diplacopa
Moths of Asia
Moths described in 1936